In Indonesia, pastel refers to a type of kue filled with meat, vegetables, and rice vermicelli deep fried in vegetable oil. It is consumed as a snack and commonly sold in Indonesian traditional markets. 
The similar Manadonese version replaces the thin crust with bread filled with spicy cakalang (skipjack tuna) and is called panada.

Pastels are derived from the Portuguese influence in Indonesia. It is a type of kue made of thin pastry crust, with a filling of meat (usually chicken or beef), vegetables (carrots and bean sprouts), rice vermicelli, and sometimes boiled eggs, then deep fried in vegetable oil. It is consumed as a snack and is commonly sold in Indonesian traditional markets. The snack is very popular during iftar for Ramadan.

The similar North Sulawesi version replaces the thin flour pie crust with bread, and is filled with spicy cakalang (skipjack tuna). This variation of the snack is called panada.

The similar Riau Islands version of pastel is called epok-epok.

See also 
 Curry puff
 Empanada
 Pastel
 Jalangkote

References 

Indonesian cuisine
Pastries